Mark Ellis is a Canadian actor and screenwriter. He was the co-showrunner and executive producer of the CBC series X Company which premiered February 18, 2015 on CBC.  He also co-created and executive produced Flashpoint which aired on CBS, CTV, ION Television and networks around the world.  The series was awarded the Academy Board of Directors Tribute for Outstanding and Enduring Contribution to Canadian Television, in addition to a Canadian Screen Award and Gemini Award for Best Dramatic Series.  Ellis and his spouse Stephanie Morgenstern have received Gemini and Writers Guild awards for their writing in the series.  He has appeared in television, film and theatre, including the Emmy Award-winning Dark Oracle. He co-wrote and starred in the Genie-nominated short film Remembrance.

External links 
 
 Article referencing Mark Ellis

Living people
Canadian male film actors
Canadian male screenwriters
Canadian male television actors
Canadian television writers
Canadian Screen Award winners
Canadian male television writers
21st-century Canadian screenwriters
Place of birth missing (living people)
Year of birth missing (living people)